The 2008 Indonesian GP2 Asia Series round was a GP2 Asia Series motor race held on 16 and 17 February 2008 at Sentul International Circuit in Sentul, Indonesia. It was the second round of the 2008 GP2 Asia Series.

Classification

Qualifying

Feature race 

 Luca Filippi winner race but she was rejected because after stewards found out he had used tyres allocated to his teammate Hiroki Yoshimoto.
 Stephen Jelley finished 9th, but she was rejected because for having had his car refuelled on the grid prior to the start of the race.

Sprint race

Standings after the event 

Drivers' Championship standings

Teams' Championship standings

 Note: Only the top five positions are included for both sets of standings.

See also 
 2008 Indonesian Speedcar Series round

References

GP2 Asia Series